Kyle Adams (born 20 November 1996) is a New Zealand soccer player who currently plays for San Diego Loyal.

Career

Youth & College
Adams played three years of college soccer at the San Diego State University between 2015 and 2017.

While at college, Adams played with USL PDL sides FC Tucson and SoCal Surf.

Professional

Rio Grande Valley FC 
Adams joined United Soccer League side Rio Grande Valley FC Toros on 18 January 2018. He made his professional debut on 16 March 2018 in a 1–1 draw with Saint Louis FC. He made 25 appearances with the Toros during his first season.
On 20 July 2019, Adams scored his first goal for the Toros in the 90th minute to give RGVFC a 2–1 win over Sacramento Republic. Adams served as the captain for RGVFC during the 2019 season. Throughout the season Adams was promoted to the Toro's MLS affiliate Houston Dynamo on short-term loans, but he did not appear in any games.

Houston Dynamo 
On 25 January 2020, Adams signed with the Houston Dynamo.  He was loaned back to RGVFC in 2020, where he made 9 appearances in a shortened season due to the COVID-19 pandemic. His contract option was declined by Houston following their 2020 season.

Real Monarchs
On 8 January 2021, Adams joined USL Championship side Real Monarchs.

San Diego Loyal
On 5 January 2022, Adams moved again within the USL Championship, joining San Diego Loyal.

Career statistics

References

External links 
 Kyle Adams at San Diego State Aztecs
 

1972 births
Living people
New Zealand association footballers
New Zealand expatriate association footballers
San Diego State Aztecs men's soccer players
FC Tucson players
SoCal Surf players
Rio Grande Valley FC Toros players
Houston Dynamo FC players
Real Monarchs players
San Diego Loyal SC players
Association football defenders
Expatriate soccer players in the United States
USL League Two players
USL Championship players
New Zealand youth international footballers